Air Marshal Chandrashekharan Hari Kumar, PVSM, AVSM, VM, VSM, ADC is a retired officer of the Indian Air Force. He served as Air Officer Commanding-in-Chief (AOC-in-C), Western Air Command from 1 January 2017 to 28 February 2019. He assumed the office from Air Marshal Shirish Baban Deo and was succeeded by Air Marshal Raghunath Nambiar.

Early life and education
Kumar is an alumnus of Rashtriya Indian Military College Dehradun, National Defence Academy , Defence Service Staff College, Wellington and National Defence College, New Delhi.

Career 
Kumar was commissioned into the fighter stream of the Indian Air Force on 14 December 1979. He has clocked over 3300 hours of flying and is a qualified flying instructor. He held several key operational and administrative appointments at various stages of his service including Fighter Combat Leader of a MiG-21 squadron; Commander of a front line fighter base; Ops-1A; Air-I at HQ WAC; Deputy Director Air Staff Inspection; Director Operations (Joint Planning); Assistant Chief of the Air Staff Operations (Offensive) at Air HQ; Senior Air Staff Officer (SASO) at HQ South Western Air Command; instructor at Fighter Training Wing (FTW), Tactics and Air Combat Development Establishment (TACDE) and College of Air Warfare (CAW). He was the AOC-in-C Eastern Air Command prior to his appointment  as AOC-in-C Western Air Command.

Kumar has been awarded several medals:  the Param Vishisht Seva Medal (January 2018), the Ati Vishisht Seva Medal (January 2016), the Vishisht Seva Medal (January 2015), the Vayu Sena Medal (January 2011) and the CAS commendation (October 1997).

Personal life 
Kumar is married to Mrs. Devika and they have two sons. He enjoys travelling and reading.

References 

Living people
Indian Air Force air marshals
Recipients of the Vayu Sena Medal
Recipients of the Ati Vishisht Seva Medal
1979 births
Recipients of the Param Vishisht Seva Medal
National Defence College, India alumni
Defence Services Staff College alumni